Miusynsk is a city in Krasnyi Luch Municipality, Luhansk Oblast (region) of Ukraine. Population: .

History 
The settlement was founded in 1923 under the name Shtergres, where gres refers to the local thermal power station built as a part of GOELRO plan.

In 1938 Shtergres got the official status of an urban-type settlement.

In 1965 the urban-type settlement of Shtergres and the village of Novopavlovka were merged, and the city of Miusynsk was established.

Starting Mid-April 2014 Miusynsk was controlled by the Luhansk People's Republic and not by Ukrainian authorities.

Demographics 
Native language as of the Ukrainian Census of 2001:
Russian  56.95%
Ukrainian  42.30%
Armenian  0.41%
Belarusian  0.08%

References

Cities in Luhansk Oblast
Don Host Oblast
Cities of district significance in Ukraine
Populated places established in the Russian Empire